Allaybaday is a town in the Maroodi Jeex region of  Somaliland, on the border with Ethiopia. It is primarily inhabited by people from the Somali ethnic group, and is dominated by the Reer Geele, Abdalla Abokor  sub divisions of the Sa'ad Musa subclan of the Habar Awal Isaaq.

Allaybaday District has 120.000 population  (2022)

See also
Administrative divisions of Somaliland
Regions of Somaliland
Districts of Somaliland

References 

Populated places in Maroodi Jeex